Railfest (or Railway Festival) is a term used by railway museums and heritage railways around the world on open days and special annual events.

The events are usually fundraising-oriented, and also involved with showing features of museums and their contents not always available in normal visiting times.  The term is found in the United States, United Kingdom and Australia for such events.

National Railway Museum
Railfest is the name given to occasional railway festivals at the National Railway Museum in York, England. There was a Railfest in 2004, and another in 2012. The 2012 event was sponsored by EMAP magazines Rail, Steam Railway and Model Rail.

2000
The 2000 event was promoted as being a celebration of 200 years of Steam.

2004
The 2004 event featured a  Turbostar DMU, a  Electrostar EMU, a  Pendolino EMU and a Eurostar train.

2012

The 2012 event had the theme of record breakers, and featured exhibits such as 
 Prototype HST power car 41001
 HST power car 43159, which jointly holds the diesel rail speed record.
 LNER Peppercorn Class A1 60163 Tornado
 GWR 3700 Class 3440 City of Truro
 LNER Class A4 4468 Mallard, holder of the steam rail speed record.
  Javelin EMU 395019
 GNR Class N2 No. 1744

References 

Railway museum events